This is a list of football clubs in Uzbekistan.

 Andijan
 Bunyodkor
 Buxoro
 Dustlik
 Lokomotiv Tashkent
 Mash'al Mubarek
 Metalourg Bekabad
 Nasaf Qarshi
 Navbahor Namangan
 Neftchi Farg'ona
 Olmaliq
 Pakhtakor Tashkent
 Qizilqum Zarafshon
 Samarqand-Dinamo
 Shurtan Guzar
 Sogdiana Jizak
 Traktor Tashkent
 Uzbek El Clasico
 Vobkent
 Xorazm Urganch

Uzbekistan
 
Football clubs
clubs